Robert's Lounge was a saloon located at 114-45 Lefferts Boulevard, in South Ozone Park, Queens, New York City.

The saloon was used as a hangout by Paul Vario. The basement was a graveyard for mob victims. A human leg bone and a portion of a human shoulder bone were excavated from the basement on June 6, 1980. The bones were thought to have been those of two of Burke's associates, Thomas DeSimone and Martin Krugman, who went missing a short time after the Lufthansa heist.

References

Bibliography
 

 

Drinking establishments in New York City
Lufthansa heist
Vario Crew
Lucchese crime family
Buildings and structures in Queens, New York